Secret Stadium Sauce is a condiment popular at Milwaukee Brewers baseball games in Milwaukee, Wisconsin.  Originally developed for use at Milwaukee County Stadium, it is still served on hot dogs and brats at its replacement, American Family Field.

It is a product of Delaware North Companies Sportservice and is sold in 18-ounce bottles at grocery stores throughout Wisconsin.

Origins
It was created in the early 1970s by current Delaware North Companies Sportservice President Rick Abramson, then a vendor at County Stadium, during a game when he ran short of other condiments.

The sauce gained popularity in the 1980s when baseball broadcaster Bob Costas expressed his love for the sauce on bratwurst at Brewer games and mentioned how he and fellow broadcaster Tony Kubek traded broadcasting duties during games so they could eat brats with the sauce during the broadcasts. 

In addition to being used as a condiment, the bottle's label also includes a recipe for consumers to use the sauce as a marinade.

The flavor has inspired comparisons, from "a combination of barbecue sauce and sauerkraut juice" to "a mix of clam juice and sweetened tomato sauce". Travel Channel personality Adam Richman has described the taste as a "mix between chili sauce, cocktail sauce, barbecue sauce, and ketchup."

References

External links
Scoreboard Gourmet: Secret Stadium Sauce
USA Today, "10 great places to relish fine stadium fare"
Ballpark Digest review of Miller Park concessions 
New York Times profile on Abramson
Sportservice internal publication, featuring article on Abramson 
"Hot Dogs as America" article from "Baseball as America" exhibit at the American Museum of Natural History 
"Spice it Up", Milwaukee Journal Sentinel

Milwaukee Brewers
Brand name condiments
Baseball culture